William Mason is a 4-4-0 steam locomotive currently on display at the Baltimore and Ohio Railroad Museum in Baltimore, Maryland, United States.  It was built for the Baltimore and Ohio Railroad, carrying that railroad's number 25.  The locomotive is named in honor of its builder, William Mason, who built around 754 steam locomotives at his Mason Machine Works firm in Taunton, Massachusetts, from 1853 until his death in 1883.  The engine had been one of the oldest operable examples of the American Standard design, and is the fourth oldest Baltimore and Ohio locomotive in existence, the oldest being the 0-4-0 no. 2, the Andrew Jackson from 1836, second oldest is the no. 8 0-4-0, John Hancock built later that same year, and the third being the 0-8-0 no. 57, Memnon of 1848 (The preserved Tom Thumb and Lafayette engines are replicas built by the road for exhibition purposes in 1926 and 1927, respectively).  While operable, William Mason had been one of the oldest operational locomotive in the world, and the oldest in the western hemisphere.

History and career 
The engine was built by William Mason for the Baltimore and Ohio in 1856, most likely for passenger service.  The engine, while not given a name (the road had ended the practice of naming locomotives at the time no. 25 was built), was the road's second engine to be numbered 25, replacing an earlier 4-4-0 of that number built by William Norris in 1839.  Among the engine's notable features is the "three-point suspension," where unlike most earlier locomotives (i.e. the road's Lafayette), which the front bogie has its wheels closely spaced, the number 25's bogie had its wheels spread apart, with the cylinder mounted horizontally between them.  While the engine was not the first to have this design, it represented a major improvement in locomotive design which would come to define the "American Standard" locomotive.  Another, similarly revolutionary design was the engine's smokebox.  Unlike earlier designs, such as that of the General, built a year earlier, the number 25 had its smokebox sitting on a "saddle" which carried the cylinders.  This design further lowered the engine's center of gravity and made re-boilering easier.  The number 25 was the road's first engine to have this smokebox design, as well as the road's first engine to have Stephenson link motion valve gear.

Retirement and exhibition

The number 25 served on the Baltimore and Ohio for nearly forty years.  The locomotive is one of the engines that pulled the train which carried Abraham Lincoln from Springfield, Illinois, to Washington, D.C., for his inauguration in 1861. It was renumbered to 55 in 1882 and was retired in 1892 when it was placed in storage.  Fortunately, the Baltimore and Ohio had greatly favored its locomotives, and preserved its best examples, including number 25.  The engine was displayed at the Chicago's World Fair of 1893, then at the St. Louis Exposition of 1904.  In 1927, the number 25 was given the name William Mason in honor of its builder, and was exhibited at the railroad's own Fair of the Iron Horse, then at the 1939 New York World's Fair, and finally in 1948 at the Chicago Railroad Fair.  During 1951, the engine was loaned to the Erie Railroad, operating as a traveling exhibit as part of the railroad's centennial celebration.  When not being exhibited, it remained in storage until 1953, when it was placed on display in the newly opened Baltimore and Ohio Railroad Museum, where it currently remains.

William Mason in film
Typically, when a locomotive is placed in a museum, it becomes a static exhibit there, often never to operate again. Such was not the case with the William Mason. It had remained operable during the 1950s, when it was used in movies, most notably The Great Locomotive Chase in 1956, and Raintree County a year later. After these performances it returned to the museum, seemingly never to operate again.  However, in 1998, the locomotive was restored once more to operating condition for use in the movie, Wild Wild West.  After that, it continued to appear in films such as Tuck Everlasting and Gods and Generals. In February 2003, the roof of the Baltimore and Ohio Railroad Museum's roundhouse, where the William Mason was usually displayed, had collapsed from a major snowstorm. While many engines and rolling stock sustained considerable damage from the collapse, the William Mason was not in the roundhouse at the time, having been removed for inspection by the Federal Railroad Administration, and thus escaped damage.

Current Status
In November 2004, after the roundhouse was rebuilt, the museum reopened, with the William Mason returning to display in the roundhouse shortly thereafter.  The museum operated the William Mason on select weekends in October until 2014 - after which the engine was taken out of service for its 1472-day inspection.  During the inspection, it was found that the engine's firebox crown sheet would have to be replaced for the engine to continue to operate, the cost of which exceeded the budget allocated for the engine's restoration.  Thus, the museum instead opted for a cosmetic restoration, with the engine receiving a new livery of green (a different shade from that worn post-1999) with red and gold lining.  This livery, based on the layers of paint uncovered from the engine during restoration, is believed to be closer to that originally worn by the engine.  The restored engine was returned to display in the roundhouse in September, 2017.

References

External links

William Mason Information Page

Individual locomotives of the United States
Baltimore and Ohio locomotives
4-4-0 locomotives
Standard gauge locomotives of the United States
Railway locomotives introduced in 1856
Preserved steam locomotives of Maryland